Jhonnier Esteban Montaño Barona (born 30 December 2004) is a Colombian footballer who currently plays as a midfielder for Deportivo Municipal. He is the son of footballer Jhonnier Montaño.

Career statistics

Club

Notes

References

2004 births
Living people
Footballers from Cali
Colombian footballers
Colombia youth international footballers
Colombian expatriate footballers
Association football midfielders
Club Alianza Lima footballers
Deportivo Municipal footballers
Peruvian Primera División players
Colombian expatriate sportspeople in Peru
Expatriate footballers in Peru